This is a list of series released by TVB in 2007.

Top ten drama series in ratings
The following is a list of TVB's top serial dramas in 2007 by average ratings. The list includes premiere week and final week ratings, as well as the average overall count of live Hong Kong viewers (in millions).

First line series
These dramas aired in Hong Kong from 8:00 to 8:30 pm, Monday to Friday on TVB.

Second line series
These dramas aired in Hong Kong from 8:30 to 9:30 pm, Monday to Friday on TVB.

Third line series
These dramas aired in Hong Kong from 9:30 to 10:30 pm, Monday to Friday on TVB.

Weekend Dramas

Saturday series
These dramas aired in Hong Kong from 10:30 to 11:30 pm, Saturday on TVB.

Sunday series
These dramas aired in Hong Kong from 10:00 to 11:30 pm, Sunday on TVB.

Warehoused series
These dramas were released overseas and have not broadcast on TVB Jade Channel.

References

External links
  TVB.com

2007
2007 in Hong Kong television